The AFL Players Association (AFLPA) awards are a group of awards given annually to players in the Australian Football League, voted for by all AFL players.

Main awards
The AFLPA nominates the following four awards as their main awards.

Leigh Matthews Trophy

The Leigh Matthews Trophy has been awarded by the players to the best player of the season annually since 1982. It is the AFLPA equivalent of the Brownlow Medal (voted for by umpires), and a variety of media-sponsored MVP awards. Gary Ablett, Jr. (2007–09, 2012–13) is the only player to win the award five times. Greg Williams (1985, 1994), Wayne Carey (1995, 1998), Michael Voss (2002, 2003), Chris Judd (2006, 2011) and Nat Fyfe (2014, 2015) have won the award twice.

Best captain
The Best Captain award was given sporadically from 1986 until 1997, and has been given annually since 1998. Michael Voss won the award four times from 2001–2004, the most of any player.

Best first-year player
Awarded annually since 1998, the Best First-Year Player award is awarded to the best adjudged player who is in his first year on an AFL list. The eligibility for the award is different from the AFL's other main award for the best performing young player, the AFL Rising Star, which can be won by any player aged under 21 as of 1 January that year, and who has not played more than ten matches before the start of the season. Michael Barlow, for example, won the award in 2010 but was not eligible for the Rising Star. Brownlow Medallists Adam Goodes and Chris Judd have both won the award in the past.

Robert Rose Award
Awarded annually since 1991 to the most courageous player in the league. Glenn Archer has won the award most often (with six wins), while Paul Kelly won it five times, including four consecutively from 1994–1997. Jonathan Brown won the award in 2007, 2008 and 2011. In 2009, Joel Selwood won the award for the first time, and then won it three consecutive times from 2012–2014.

Other awards
The following awards are also currently or have previously been presented by the AFLPA.

Marn Grook Award
Named after the indigenous game Marn Grook, the award was presented annually from 2001 to 2007 for the top emerging Indigenous player in the game, who must be within their first three seasons of AFL competition.

Winners

Grant Hattam Award
The Grant Hattam Award has been awarded annually since 1999 to the most outstanding piece of football journalism for that year as voted by the players. All forms of media from all around Australia are eligible for this award.

The award was created in honour and memory of the late Grant Hattam, who was a leading sports and media lawyer.

Education and Training Excellence Award
The Education and Training Excellence Award has been given annually since 2001 to the player who displays the best all-round performance in balancing football with external education and training. Since 2017, the award has been presented to a winner from both the male Australian Football League competition, and the female AFL Women's competition.

Mike Fitzpatrick Scholarships
Awarded annually to young aspiring non-AFL players, attempting to help them balance external study and training with football training.

References

External links
AFLPA Awards homepage

Australian Football League awards
Australian rules football awards